The .45 ACP (Automatic Colt Pistol) or .45 Auto (11.43×23mm) is a rimless straight-walled handgun cartridge designed by John Moses Browning in 1904, for use in his prototype Colt semi-automatic pistol. After successful military trials, it was adopted as the standard chambering for Colt's M1911 pistol. The round was developed due to a lack of stopping power experienced in the Moro Rebellion in places like Sulu. The issued ammunition, .38 Long Colt, had proved inadequate, motivating the search for a better cartridge. This experience and the Thompson–LaGarde Tests of 1904 led the Army and the Cavalry to decide that a minimum of .45 caliber was required in a new handgun cartridge.

The standard issue military .45 ACP round uses a 230-grain (14.9 g) round nose projectile that travels at approximately 830 feet per second (250 m/s) when fired from a government-issue M1911A1 pistol. Since standard-pressure .45 ACP rounds are subsonic when fired from handguns and submachine guns, it is a useful caliber for suppressed weapons to eliminate the sonic boom.
 
Today, most NATO militaries use sidearms chambered for the 9×19mm Parabellum cartridge, but the effectiveness of the .45 ACP cartridge has ensured its continued popularity with large-caliber sport shooters, especially in the United States. In 1985, the .45 ACP M1911A1 pistol was replaced by the Beretta M9 9 mm pistol as the main sidearm of the U.S. military, which in turn was replaced with the SIG Sauer P320 9 mm pistol in 2017, designated M17 for the full-size and M18 for the compact.

Design and history

During the late 19th century and early 20th centuries, the U.S. Cavalry began trials to replace their sidearm arsenal of issued .45 Colt Single Action Army (SAA) in favor of the more modern and versatile double-action revolver in .45 Colt.

After the example of the Cavalry, the Army in turn had fielded versions of double-action revolvers in .38 Long Colt. It was eventually evaluated that the .38 caliber round was significantly less effective in overall stopping power than the .45 Colt against determined opponents in cases such as the Tausug Moro juramentado warriors, who were encountered in the Moro Rebellion. The standard-issue rifle, the .30-40 Krag, had also failed to stop Moro warriors effectively; the British had similar lack-of-stopping-power issues switching to the .303 British, which resulted in the development of the dum-dum bullet, in an attempt to compensate for the round's deficiencies. This experience, and the Thompson–LaGarde Tests of 1904, led the Army and the Cavalry to decide a minimum of .45 caliber was required in a new handgun. Thompson and Major Louis Anatole La Garde of the medical corps arranged tests on cadavers and animals in the Chicago stockyards, resulting in their declaring that the .45 was the most effective pistol cartridge. They noted, however, training was critical to make sure a soldier could score a hit in a vulnerable part of the body.

Colt had been working with Browning on a .41 caliber cartridge in 1904, and in 1905, when the Cavalry asked for a .45-caliber equivalent, Colt modified the pistol design to fire an enlarged version of the prototype .41 round. The result from Colt was the Model 1905 and the new .45 ACP cartridge. The resulting .45 caliber cartridge, named the ".45 ACP", was similar in performance to the .45 Schofield cartridge and only slightly less powerful while significantly shorter than the .45 Colt cartridge that the United States Cavalry was using at the time.

By 1906, bids from six makers were submitted, among them, Browning's design, submitted by Colt. Only DWM, Savage, and Colt made the first cut. DWM, which submitted two Parabellums chambered in .45 ACP, withdrew from testing after the first round of tests, for unspecified reasons.

In the second round of evaluations in 1910, the Colt design passed extensive testing with no failures, while the Savage design suffered 37 stoppages or parts failures. The Colt pistol was adopted as the Model 1911.

The cartridge-pistol combination was quite successful but not satisfactory for U.S. military purposes. The first production, at Frankford Arsenal, was marked "F A 8 11", for the August 1911 date.

The cartridge was designed by John Browning for Colt, but the most influential person in selecting the cartridge was Army ordnance member General John T. Thompson. After the poor performance of the Army's .38 Long Colt pistols evidenced during the Philippine–American War (1899–1902), Thompson insisted on a more capable pistol cartridge.

Military cartridges

U.S. military

The "T" (trials) designation was used for the experimental version of a cartridge and "M" (model) is used for the accepted and standardized version.
It came in either 24-round revolver ammo cartons, containing eight 3-round "half-moon" clips (1917-1945), pre-war 20-round cartons (1911-1942), or wartime 50-round cartons (1942–present). The M12 and M15 shotshell rounds were packed in 20-round cartons sealed in foil-lined paper.     
Caliber .45 ball M1911 was the standard full-metal jacketed lead-core bullet.     
Caliber .45 dummy M1921 has a hole drilled through the case and does not have a primer.  
Caliber .45 blank M9 has a tapered case and does not have a bullet.
Caliber .45 shot M12(T23) (1943-1944 ) was a survival round with a round-nosed red wax paper projectile containing 118 pieces of No .7  birdshot. It was issued in USAAF survival kits to allow pilots and aircrew armed with the Colt M1911A1 to use it for hunting small game. The shotshell was a little longer than a standard round, so the operator had to load it in the action individually. It was extracted after firing by removing the magazine, pulling back the slide, and pushing down on the case until it fell down the magazine well. Reports showed that the paper projectile was affected by humidity and would swell or break apart. It was made limited standard until replaced by the .45 M15 shot cartridge.   
Caliber .45 shot M15 was an improved survival round loaded with 108 pieces of No. 7 birdshot, with wadding and a vermilion cardboard disc sealing the casemouth. It was loaded and extracted exactly like the M12 shot cartridge. 
Caliber .45 tracer M26 (T30) has a red tip. The round was designed as a short-ranged red flare for use in emergency signalling.

Commonwealth military
"S.A." stands for small arms. The "z" in the designation stands for cartridges loaded with nitrocellulose rather than cordite.
Cartridge, S.A., pistol, .45-inch Colt Automatic, ball (1917) was the British designation used for American-manufactured ammunition. The Royal Navy had purchased a shipment of M1911 pistols in 1917 along with enough ammunition for evaluation, training and service purposes. It was never standardized by the Lists of Changes, but was mentioned in the Vocabulary of Priced Stores. It came in seven-round packets and was manufactured by Winchester. 
Cartridge, S.A., .45-inch, ball Mk Iz (1940–1945) was the designation used for American-manufactured ammunition and proposed British manufacture of .45 M1911 ball. Lend-lease ammunition came in commercial 42-round Winchester or 50-round Western Cartridge Company cartons. U.S. military-issue ammunition came in 20-round cartons, shifting to larger 50-round cartons in early 1942. It was never manufactured in Britain because it was readily available from American forces.
Cartridge, S.A., .45-inch, ball Mk IIz (1943) was a variant proposed for the Royal Navy, but never put into production. 
Cartridge, S.A., .45-inch A. C., ball (1942–1946) was the Canadian designation for their domestically manufactured ammunition for use in the European theater. It came in a plain 42-round carton that mimicked the capacity and dimensions of the yellow commercial Winchester ammunition cartons sold to Britain through Lend-lease.
Cartridge, S.A., .450-inch, ball Mk IIz (1943–1956) was the Australian designation used for their domestically-manufactured ammunition for use in the Pacific theater. It came in 24-round cartons.

French Union military
Cartouche de 11,4 3mm, Pour Pistolets ('11.43 mm cartridge for pistols'): Balle ordinaire ('ordinary ball') pistol ammunition. Post-war production for use in the pistols and submachineguns given out by the US as military aid. It came in 25-round cartons.

Cartridge dimensions
The .45 ACP has 1.62 mL (25 g H2O) cartridge case capacity.

45 Auto maximum CIP cartridge dimensions. All sizes are in millimeters (mm).

SAAMI specifications for 45 Automatic. All dimensions are in inches (millimeters)

The cartridge headspaces on the mouth of the case at the L3 datum reference.

According to Commission internationale permanente pour l'épreuve des armes à feu portatives (CIP) rulings, the .45 ACP cartridge case can handle up to  Pmax piezo pressure. In CIP-regulated countries every pistol cartridge combination has to be proofed at 130% of this maximum CIP pressure to certify for sale to consumers. This means that .45 ACP chambered arms in CIP-regulated countries are currently (2016) proof-tested at  PE piezo pressure.

Performance
The .45 ACP is an effective combat pistol cartridge. It combines accuracy as well as stopping power for use against human targets, has relatively low muzzle blast and flash, and it produces a stout, but manageable recoil in handguns (made worse in compact models).
The .45 ACP is generally considered to have a higher stopping power as compared to 9mm. Due to its larger size and slower velocity it creates a larger wound channel and transfers more energy to the target.

The standard-issue, military .45 ACP cartridge contains a 230-grain bullet that travels at approximately  when fired from the government-issue M1911A1 pistol, and approximately  fired from the Thompson M1A1 submachine gun. The cartridge comes in various specialty rounds of varying weights and performance levels as well.

Some makers of pistols chambered in .45 ACP do not certify them to use Plus P ammunition.

In its non-expanding full metal jacket (FMJ) version, the .45 ACP cartridge has a reputation for effectiveness against human targets because of its heavy mass, having the capacity to penetrate tissue deeply, and damage the central nervous system. Its large 11.5 mm diameter creates a more substantial permanent wound channel versus smaller calibers, which can lower blood pressure rapidly if critical organs of the circulatory system are hit.

In its expanding hollow point form, it is also particularly effective against human targets. In tests against ballistic gelatin, a 185-grain hollow point traveling at 1,050 feet per second expanded to about .76 inch. This is a significantly large permanent wound cavity for a handgun projectile. For those who follow the energy dump and/or hydrostatic shock theories of wounding ballistics, this is ideal. While slightly decreasing penetration and likewise the chance of hitting a vital organ, a large diameter wound will cause more blood loss. There is also a reduced likelihood of overpenetration, meaning that it is more likely that the projectile will transfer all of its kinetic energy to the intended target, thus more reliably incapacitating them.

Drawbacks for military use include the cartridge's large size, weight, increased material costs in comparison to the smaller, flatter shooting NATO standard 9×19mm Parabellum cartridge, a cartridge which uses less powder, brass, and lead per round. Standard 9mm NATO ammunition has a more limited armor penetration capability—a deficiency shared with .45 ACP, whose large, slow bullet does not penetrate armor to any great extent. The low muzzle velocity also makes the bullet drop over long ranges, making hits more difficult; however, it is important to note that the vast majority of self-defense situations involving handguns typically occur at close ranges.

After two years of testing, one of the final FBI comments was that services that adopt (or stay with) .40 S&W or .45 ACP did so at the risk of increased recoil and a possible reduction in accuracy as 9×19mm with premium quality ammunition had nearly exactly the same performance. A factor rated by the recent FBI testing was accuracy and time to recover. The .45 ACP handguns ranked last, largely due to increased recoil.

Use in suppressors
As standard pressure .45 ACP rounds fired from handguns and submachine guns are inherently subsonic, it is one of the most powerful pistol calibers available for use in suppressed weapons since subsonic rounds are quieter than supersonic rounds. The latter inevitably produce a highly compressed shock wave, audible as a loud "crack", a small sonic boom, while they travel through the air. Suppressors reduce the audible "report" by slowing and channeling the high speed gas generated by the burning/expanding gunpowder before it exits the muzzle resulting in a muffled "cough". Suppressors cannot act on a supersonic shock wave continuously generated by a bullet exceeding the  speed of sound at  ambient cold temperatures, as this shock wave is continuously produced throughout the entire flight path over which the bullet is supersonic, which extends long after it exits the barrel.

The downside to the use of .45 ACP in suppressed weapons is that increasing the diameter of the passage through a suppressor decreases the suppressor's efficiency; thus, while .45 ACP is among the most powerful suppressed pistol rounds, it is also one of the loudest. Most .45 suppressors must be fired "wet" (with an ablative medium, usually oil or water) to bring sound levels down to "hearing-safe" (under 140 dB, generally).

Magazine capacities
Magazine capacity varies depending on the type of firearm. Standard (not extended) single-stack magazines, pistols based on the 1911 design commonly hold eight rounds or fewer. Many modern pistols have adapted the cartridge into double-stacked magazine designs to increase ammo capacity, though this increases the pistol's handle girth, but not width. The less-rounded back strap helps to spread the recoil out more and make the pistol more pleasant to shoot. Drum magazines used mostly for submachine guns have a capacity of 50 or 100 rounds.

Adoption

Several US tactical police units still use the .45 pistol round. While high capacity firearms are available in .45 ACP, the greater length and diameter of the .45 ACP means that the grip of the pistol must be longer and wider than the grip of a comparable pistol of a smaller caliber; this increase in grip size can make the pistol difficult to use for shooters with smaller hands.

Today, most NATO militaries use sidearms chambered for the 9×19mm Parabellum cartridge, but the effectiveness of the .45 ACP cartridge has ensured its continued popularity with large-caliber sport shooters, especially in the United States. In addition, select military and police units around the world still use firearms firing the .45 ACP. In 1985, the .45 ACP M1911A1 pistol was replaced by the Beretta M9 9mm pistol as the main sidearm of the U.S. military, although select Special Operations units continue to use the M1911A1 or other .45 ACP pistols.

Load variants
Target shooters competing in Bullseye Pistol (aka Precision Pistol) find that .45 ACP ammunition using light bullets (12 to 13 g) and low velocities paradoxically generates less recoil than 9mm ammunition of equivalent accuracy, despite its larger caliber, and allows better scores in sustained fire. Hollow-point rounds intended for maximum effectiveness against live targets are designed to expand upon impact with soft tissue, increasing the size of the permanent cavity left by the bullet as it passes through the target.

Tracer ammunition for the .45 ACP was manufactured by Frankford Arsenal and by Remington Arms. This ammunition was available to the United States Border Patrol as early as 1940 and was used through World War II for emergency signalling by downed United States Navy and Marine Corps air crew. Tracer ammunition was identified by painting the bullet tip red.

Plus P 
Most ammunition manufacturers also market what are termed "+P" (pronounced "plus P", designating overpressure ammunition) loadings in pistol ammunition, including the .45 ACP. This means the cartridge is loaded to a higher maximum pressure level than the original SAAMI cartridge standard, generating higher velocity and more muzzle energy. This is a common practice for updating older cartridges to match the better quality of materials and workmanship in modern firearms.

The terminology is generally given as "45 ACP +P" and sometimes, but not always, appears on the headstamp. These cartridges have the same external dimensions as the standard-pressure cartridges and will chamber and fire in all firearms designed for the standard-pressure loadings. The inner dimensions of the +P cartridge are different from the standard-pressure cartridge dimensions and thus allows for higher pressures to be safely achieved in the +P cartridge. If +P loadings are used in firearms not specifically designed for them, they may cause damage to the weapon and injuries to the operator.

Others
Popular derivative versions of the .45 ACP are .45 Super and .460 Rowland. The Rowland operates at a developer established  SAAMI and may only be used within a select group of firearms significantly modified for this purpose; the Rowland case is  longer specifically to prevent it from being chambered in standard .45 ACP firearms. Brass cases for each of these cartridges carry the applicable name within the headstamp. The Super provides approximately 20% greater velocity than the .45 ACP +P; the Rowland approximately 40% greater velocity than the .45 ACP +P.

Synonyms
45 (colloquial in English, Spanish, and Tagalog)
.45 ACP (Automatic Colt Pistol)
.45 Rimless Smokeless
.45 Auto
45 Auto. Colt / 45 AC (Winchester Repeating Arms Company)
11.43×23 mm (Metric)
11,43 (Mexico, Obregón pistol)
11.25 mm (Norway and Argentina)
11 mm 43 (France)
11 mm (Southeast Asia)

Related rounds
.38/45 Clerke

.400 Cor-Bon
.45 Auto Rim
.45 GAP
.45 Peters-Thompson shot cartridge
.45 Remington–Thompson
.45 Super
.45 Winchester Magnum
.450 SMC
.451 Detonics Magnum
.460 Rowland
.50 GI

See also
List of .45 caliber handguns
Table of handgun and rifle cartridges

References

Citations

Sources

 Official U.S. Army description of the original Model 1911 pistol, including its .45 ACP ammunition.

External links

45 ACP Videos
Ballistics By The Inch 45ACP results.
SAAMI Specification

Pistol and rifle cartridges
Military cartridges
.45 ACP firearms
Colt cartridges